Western Army may refer to:
 Western Army (Japan), an active army of the Japan Ground Self-Defense Force
 Western Army (Ottoman Empire), active during the First Balkan War
 Western Army (Russia), an army of the Russian SFSR formed in 1918
 Western Army of the White Movement, formed in January 1919
 the forces of the Toyotomi clan during the Siege of Osaka

See also 
 First Western Army, an army of Imperial Russia active during the Napoleonic Wars
 Second Western Army, an army of Imperial Russia active during the Napoleonic Wars